"My Heart Belongs to Daddy" is a song by Cole Porter, and it may also refer to:

"My Heart Belongs to Daddy" (Desperate Housewives), an episode of the TV series
My Heart Belongs to Daddy (film), a 1942 film starring Frances Gifford